Canada's National History Society is a charitable organization based in Winnipeg, Manitoba, Canada. The Society was founded in 1994 by the Hudson's Bay Company (HBC) for the purpose of promoting greater popular interest in Canadian history principally through its publishing activities and outreach and recognition programs. The Society receives a core grant from the Hudson's Bay Company History Foundation annually, but operates as an independent entity. Its operating budget averages $2.7 million a year, and its largest share of revenues comes from its membership who in addition to subscribing to their magazines also contribute charitable donations. 66% of total annual revenues come from individual subscriptions and donations.    
 
From 2007 to 2009 it partnered with HBC to administer the HBC Local History Grants Program which provided modest support to small community-based history projects. Today the History Society continues to support local history organizations through the Canada's History Awards program as well as its website's news and travel services.

Publications

===Canada's History''' magazine===
Its flagship product is Canada's History magazine (until 2010 known as The Beaver: Canada's History Magazine). Produced six times a year with a current paid subscriber/membership base of 44,000. In 2017 Canada's History released an archive of the back catalogue of The Beaver.

===Kayak' magazine===
In addition, the History Society launched Kayak: Canada's History Magazine for Kids in 2003 which now published quarterly in English and in French as an insert to Quebec children's magazine Les Editions Les Debrouillards. Paid circulation for the English edition is just under 6,000.

Books
To date, The History Society has published five books: 
 For The Love of History (Random House 2005), an anthology of the collected works of the first decade of Pierre Berton Award recipients; 
 Those Earlier Hills (Heritage House 2007), a collection of R.M. Patterson's articles which appeared in The Beaver magazine; 
 100 Photos That Changed Canada'' (2009) celebrating Canada's most memorable photographs.

Awards programs
In addition to its publishing projects, the History Society produces Canada's History Awards, a national celebration of the country's top history honours including the Governor General's Awards for Excellence in Teaching Canadian History and the Pierre Berton Award for achievement in popular history. In 2008, the History Society established the National Forum on Canadian History as part of the annual Awards events as an opportunity to bring students, teachers, historians, museum specials, and history organizations together to discuss ways to improve formal and informal history education in Canada.

The Governor General's History Awards
The Governor General's History Awards program were established in 1996 by Canada's National History Society.  The awards include a number of separate awards programs:
  The Governor General's Awards for Excellence in Teaching Canadian History
  Excellence in Museums: History Alive! award for innovative museum programming (Canadian Museums Association)
  The Sir John A. Macdonald Prize for scholarly research (The Canadian Historical Association)
  Excellence in Community Programming
  National Student Awards including: Kayak Kids' Illustrated History Challenge, The Government of Canada History Awards for Students, Aboriginal Arts & Stories, and the Experiences Canada Awards

Pierre Berton Award 
Established in 1994, the Pierre Berton Award is presented annually by the Society for distinguished achievement in presenting Canadian history in an informative and engaging manner. The award program is currently known as the Governor General's Award for Popular Media: the Pierre Berton Award. Canadian writer and historian Pierre Berton was the first recipient and agreed to lend his name to future awards. The award honours those who have introduced Canadian characters and events of the past to the national and international public.

References

External links
Official website

Charities based in Canada
History organizations based in Canada
History magazines published in Canada
Publishing companies of Canada